Ravish Desai (born 22 November 1986) is an Indian actor and model who works in Bollywood movies, Hindi-language  TV serials and web series. He is mostly known for his work in TV commercials.

Early & Personal life

Ravish Desai was born on 22 November 1986 in Mumbai into a Gujarati family to parents Mukesh Desai and Alpa Desai. He received his schooling from G.D. Somani Memorial School, Cuffe Parade. He completed his graduation from Jai Hind College. He went on to complete his post graduation from JBIMS. 

After finishing his MBA, Ravish worked as a consultant with JP Morgan Chase, Ernst and Young. He then quit his job to pursue his dream of becoming an actor. He was always fascinated by cinema during his childhood. He is also trained in Karate with a Brown Belt ownership.

He met actress  Mugdha Chaphekar on the sets of the  show Satrangi Sasural where they played leads in 2014. They fell in love and got engaged on 30 January 2016 and married on 14 December the same year in Mumbai.

Filmography

Television

Web series

References

External links
 

Living people
Gujarati people
Male actors from Mumbai
Indian male models
Jai Hind College alumni
1986 births